Bhur Gewog is a former gewog (village block) of Sarpang District, Bhutan. Bhur Gewog, together with Serzhong, Taklai, and Gelephu Gewogs, belongs to Gelephu Dungkhag.

References

Former gewogs of Bhutan
Sarpang District